Transmembrane and ubiquitin-like domain-containing protein 2 is a protein that in humans is encoded by the TMUB2 gene.

Gene 
TMUB2 maps on the human chromosome 17, at locus 17q21.31. TMUB2 sits between two neighboring genes, ASB16-AS1 to the left and ATXN7L3 to the right. TMUB2 is 4.99Kb long. The TMUB2 gene can be transcribed into three possible mRNA variants.

Expression 
TMUB2 is likely ubiquitously expressed throughout the human body. It has a high expression level that is 2.9 times higher than other human genes.

Protein 
The TMUB2 protein has a function that is not currently known. It consists of a 321 amino acid long chain in humans. The human protein has a molecular weight of 33.8kdal, an isoelectric point of 4.73899, and three transmembrane regions. These will likely vary in orthologs.

Homology

Paralogs 
TMUB1 is the only paralog of TMUB2. These proteins share a 38% identity and 51% similarity.

Orthologs 
The table below presents a selection of some of the TMUB2 orthologs to display protein diversity among species.
*Limited Query Coverage

Protein Interactions 
In humans, Ubiquitin C (UBC) is a protein with a known interaction with TMUB2. Other proposed interactions include BCL2L13 (BCL2-like 13), SGTA (Small glutamine-rich tetratricopeptide repeat-containing protein), and UBQLN1 (Ubiquilin-1).

References

Further reading